Dryden High School (2009 population 830) is a composite secondary school situated in Dryden, Ontario, Canada.

Activities
Dryden High School runs a competitive athletics program as part of the Northwestern Ontario Secondary School Athletics league (NorWOSSA). Dryden High School currently has teams in Hockey, Volleyball, Basketball, Soccer, Football, Wrestling, Cheerleading, Track and Field, Cross Country Running and Cross Country Skiing. In the past, Dryden High School has run a Curling team.

Dryden High School has a popular Music program, with student Jazz, Concert and sometimes Pit (musical) bands.

The Drama Association puts on yearly productions. This year's production was Disney's High School Musical. The DA (Drama Association), normally referred to as the Drama Club, is the oldest of the Fine Arts clubs. Judith Hamilton directed many of the club's productions, which have included, Fiddler on the Roof, The Music Man, and Back to the 80s.

DHS also has a Visual Arts Association, where students learn more about art.

The Drama, Music, and Visual Arts Associations are collectively known as the Fine Arts Council.

Notable alumni

NHL Player Chris Pronger attended DHS and played on the DHS Eagles hockey team.

History
The City of Dryden offered secondary education as early as 1905, though on an informal basis. Dryden Continuation School (DCS) came into existence in 1912 and offered Second Class Matriculation (equivalent to Grade 12). In 1935, DCS evolved to a high school (DHS) when it offered First Class Matriculation (equivalent to Grade 13).

DHS was the first high school in Canada to offer a course in Forestry.

Dryden High School has the longest running industry supported conservation camp in Canada. Started in 1957, the outdoor workshop/classroom introduces students to conservation concepts and land use. The camp is presented by high school teachers, people from industry and employees of the Ministry of Natural Resources.

Athletics

Dryden High School has a rich sporting history with achievements at the local and provincial level.

List Dryden High School NorWOSSA championships:

See also
List of high schools in Ontario

References

High schools in Ontario
Dryden, Ontario
Schools in Kenora District
Educational institutions established in 1935
1935 establishments in Ontario